Cédric Fèvre-Chevalier (born 1 November 1983 in Dijon) is a Paralympic sports-shooter. He was born with a malformed spinal column. At thirteen he won his first national French title. He won gold in the Mixed 10 metre air rifle prone SH1 event at the 2012 Summer Paralympics.

References

External links 
 
 

1983 births
Living people
French male sport shooters
Paralympic shooters of France
Paralympic gold medalists for France
Paralympic medalists in shooting
Shooters at the 2012 Summer Paralympics
Medalists at the 2012 Summer Paralympics
Sportspeople from Dijon
Chevaliers of the Légion d'honneur
Shooters at the 2020 Summer Paralympics
20th-century French people
21st-century French people